XHKM-FM is a radio station on 95.3 FM in Minatitlán, Veracruz. It is owned by Núcleo Radio Mina and is known as Radio Mina with a pop format.

History
XEKM-AM 1450 received its concession on July 16, 1964. It was owned by Daniel Schacht Pérez and broadcast with 250 watts, later upgraded to 1,000. Control promptly passed to Radio Mina, S.A.

XEKM was cleared for AM-FM migration in 2010 as XHKM-FM 95.3.

References

Radio stations in Veracruz
Radio stations established in 1964